The Equestrian Federation of Pakistan (EFP) is the national governing body to promote and develop equestrian sports in Pakistan.

Dr. Farooq Ahmad is the current president of EFP.

History 
It was formed in 1980 and was under the control of Pakistan Army. However, in 2013, the EFP Board of Directors decided to shift its headquarters to Pakistan Rangers. The sport of polo, previously under EFP, was given to Pakistan Polo Association.

Disciplines 
The EFP is responsible for the following disciplines:

Olympic/FEI disciplines 

 Dressage
 Endurance riding
 Eventing
 Show jumping

International Tent Pegging Federation discipline 

 Tent pegging

Affiliations 
The federation is affiliated with:

 International Federation for Equestrian Sports
 International Tent Pegging Federation

 Asian Equestrian Federation
 Pakistan Olympic Association 
 Pakistan Sports Board

References

Sports governing bodies in Pakistan
National members of the International Federation for Equestrian Sports
Horse racing in Pakistan
Equestrian sports in Pakistan